The Duchy of Głogówek and Prudnik was one of the numerous Duchies of Silesia ruled by the Silesian branch of the royal Polish Piast dynasty.

History 
After the death of Euphemia of Masovia, widow of Vladislaus II of Opole by 1424, Bernard of Niemodlin and his brother Bolko IV of Opole inherited her dower lands, Głogówek, which at the end of that year was given to Bolko IV's son, Bolko V the Hussite.

In 1424, after Bolko V the Hussite became the independent ruler over Głogówek and Prudnik thanks to the resignation of both his father and uncle Bernard.

In 1428 Silesia was invaded by Hussite troops. In the capital of his domains, Głogówek, Bolko V decided at first to fight against them. However, almost immediately, the young Duke, at that time in Gliwice, not only decided to admit the Hussites into his city in order to avoid the destruction of his duchy, but also took the occasion to enrich himself with the secularization of the local churches (one of his first decisions was the cancellation of the building of a Kolegiata in Głogówek, which began by orders of Bolko IV). After a solemn oath, Bolko V vowed to support the Hussites, and he sent his army to help them. The cooperation with the Hussites was not just material, but also ideological. One aim of the duke was the policy of a gradual Germanization of Silesia, and the national teachings of Jan Hus fit in with this purpose. Later in that year, Bolko V took over all the goods of the Church in his Duchy.

In 1429 with the Hussites involved on other fronts, Bolko V acquired for himself the neighboring Duchy of Nysa, which belonged to the Bishopric of Wrocław. In the following year, together with his allies, he forced Polish troops to retreat to Jasna Góra, which become the new Silesian-Poland frontier. He also tried to obtain some lands from the Dukes of Brzeg: Namysłów (who could defend himself thanks to the help of the citizens of Wrocław) and Kluczbork (which was taken by him). In the following years Bolko V became the ruler of almost all Upper Silesia and parts of Lower Silesia. In his conquests, Bolko V could count on the support of his closest relatives, his father Bolko IV and his uncle Bernard. His luck turned against him on 13 May 1433, in connection with his defeat at the Battle of Trzebnica against Duke Nicholas V of Karniów. Despite this, Bolko V managed to maintain until his death the majority of Church goods obtained after the secularization. For this, in 1443 he was excommunicated.

During 1444–1452 Bolko V led a fight against the Bishop of Kraków, Zbigniew Oleśnicki, over the buying of the Duchy of Siewierz. This war resulted in significant destruction on the Silesian-Lesser Poland frontier. The Emperor Frederick III feared a complete collapse of the Silesian states. The dispute only ended in 1452 during the Polish Sejm in Piotrków, where Bolko V even offered the Polish King Casimir IV financial assistance for a war against the Teutonic Order in exchange for the district of Wieluń as a lien (the proposal wasn't accepted).

Bolko V died on 29 May 1460 in his favorite residence, Głogówek, and was buried in the local Franciscan church. Without surviving male heirs, he was succeeded in all his domains by his only surviving brother, Nicholas I.

Dukes of Głogówek and Prudnik 

 1420–1424 – Bernard of Niemodlin
 1420–1424 – Bolko IV of Opole
 1424–1460 – Bolko V the Hussite
 1460 – Nicholas I of Opole

References 

Duchies of Silesia
States and territories established in 1420
1460 disestablishments in Europe